Acanthodoris globosa is a species of sea slug, a dorid nudibranch, a shell-less marine gastropod mollusc in the family Onchidorididae.

Distribution 
This species was described from New Zealand. It has not been reported since the original description.

References

Onchidorididae
Gastropods described in 1877
Taxa named by Phineas S. Abraham